Japanese football in 2009

J.League Division 1

J.League Division 2

Japan Football League

Japanese Regional Leagues

Emperor's Cup

J.League Cup

National team (Men)

Results

Players statistics

National team (Women)

Results

Players statistics

External links

 
Seasons in Japanese football